Julien Peyrelongue (born 2 April 1981, in Bayonne) is a French rugby union fly-half, currently playing for the Pro D2 team Dax.

Club career
Having spent his youth years at Peyrehorade, Peyrelongue left in 2000 for Biarritz, where he spent his entire professional career. He won two French championships in 2005 and 2006 and reached the final of the Heineken Cup twice in 2006 and 2010.

International career
Peyrelongue made his international debut on 21 February 2004 in the Six Nations Championship match against Italy in a game that he played in its entirety alongside his Biarritz teammate Dimitri Yachvili. He also played the second half of France's game against Scotland, helping France to their second Grand Slam in three years.
He played four more games in 2004, against Canada during France's summer tour and all three games during the autumn internationals, but was never called up again afterwards.

Honours
Biarritz Olympique
Top 16 (2005)
Top 14 (2006)
France
Grand Slam (2004)

References

1981 births
Living people
Sportspeople from Bayonne
French rugby union players
US Dax players
France international rugby union players
Biarritz Olympique players
Rugby union fly-halves